Culross railway station served the village of Culross, Fife, Scotland from 1906 to
1992 on the Kincardine Line.

History 
The station opened on 2 July 1906 by the North British Railway. To the northwest was the goods yard. The signal box closed in 1923 when the loop was lifted. The station closed on 7 July 1930 but the line remained open for goods with two power stations: Longannet power station and Kincardine power station. A second station opened  on 21 July 1992 but was short lived because it was only used for workers at Longannet power station so it closed later in the year on 22 August.

References

External links 

Disused railway stations in Fife
Railway stations in Great Britain opened in 1906
Railway stations in Great Britain closed in 1992
Former North British Railway stations
1906 establishments in Scotland
1992 disestablishments in Scotland